Gaudo Airfield is an abandoned World War II military airfield in Southern Italy, approximately 3 km north of Paestum, where the neolithic necropolis belonging to the Gaudo Culture was discovered, about 70 km southeast of Naples.   It was a temporary airfield built by the United States Army Corps of Engineers.  Its last known use was by the United States Army Air Force Twelfth Air Force in 1944 during the Italian Campaign.

 12th Bombardment Group, 19 January-6 February 1944, B-25 Mitchell
 321st Bombardment Group, February–April 1944, B-25 Mitchell
 62d Troop Carrier Group, May–June 1944, C-47 Skytrain

A significant number of aircraft were damaged at the airfield in March 1944 when Mount Vesuvius erupted. The last use was in June 1944 by C-47s, and afterward the airfield was dismantled and closed.  Today the site of the airfield is indistinguishable from the many agricultural fields in the area.

References

 Maurer, Maurer. Air Force Combat Units of World War II. Maxwell AFB, Alabama: Office of Air Force History, 1983. .

See also
Gaudo Culture

Airfields of the United States Army Air Forces in Italy
Buildings and structures in the Metropolitan City of Naples
Defunct airports in Italy
Demolished buildings and structures in Italy
Mount Vesuvius
Airports established in 1943
Airports disestablished in 1944
1943 establishments in Italy
1944 disestablishments in Italy